Panchamrita (lit. five s) is a mixture of five foods used in Hindu as well as Jain worship and puja and Abhiṣeka It is often used as an offering during pooja post which it is distributed as prasad.

There are regional variations in the ingredients used. In Nepal and North India, usually honey(मधु), sugar(शर्करा), cow milk(दुग्ध), curd(दधि) and ghee(घृत) are used as the main ingredients.

In Tamil Nadu, Panchamritam is a mixture of banana, ghee, honey, jaggery and cardamom. In addition, other substances like seedless dates and sugar candies are added. Keralites may also include tender coconut. Some recipes also include grapes.

Palani Dhandayuthapani temple located in Tamil Nadu is popular for its unique panchamirtham which uses Virupatchi hill bananas grown in the surrounding Palani hills. It received its unique Geographical indication in 2019 from the Government of India.

References

Objects used in Hindu worship
Puja (Hinduism)
Religious food and drink
Food and drink in Hinduism